Paul Neagu (born 6 June 1954) is a Romanian bobsledder. He competed at the 1976, 1992 and the 1998 Winter Olympics.

References

External links
 
 
 
 

1954 births
Living people
Romanian male bobsledders
Olympic bobsledders of Romania
Bobsledders at the 1976 Winter Olympics
Bobsledders at the 1992 Winter Olympics
Bobsledders at the 1998 Winter Olympics
Sportspeople from Constanța